Indonesicesa is a genus of flies in the family Neriidae.

Species
Indonesicesa annulipes (Doleschall, 1857)
Indonesicesa lieftincki (Aczél, 1954)
Indonesicesa mantoides (Walker, 1861)

References

Brachycera genera
Neriidae
Diptera of Australasia
Fauna of New Guinea